AT-rich interactive domain-containing protein 3B is a protein that in humans is encoded by the ARID3B gene.

Function 

This gene encodes a member of the ARID (AT-rich interaction domain) family of DNA-binding proteins. The encoded protein is homologous with two proteins that bind to the retinoblastoma gene product, and also with the mouse Bright and Drosophila dead ringer proteins. A pseudogene on chromosome 1p31 exists for this gene. Members of the ARID family have roles in embryonic patterning, cell lineage gene regulation, cell cycle control, transcriptional regulation and possibly in chromatin structure modification.

References

Further reading

External links 
 
 

Transcription factors